Mitropsis is a monotypic genus of sea snails in the family Columbellidae, the dove snails.

Species
 Mitropsis paumotensis (Tryon, 1883)
Synonym
 Mitropsis fusiformis Pease, 1868: synonym of Mitropsis paumotensis (Tryon, 1883) (invalid: treated as a secondary homonym of Columbella fusiformis by Tryon, who established the replacement name Columbella paumotensis)

Distribution
This marine species was found off the Tuamotu archipelago.

References

Gloria Maris 56(4): 118-151

External links

 Pease W.H. (1868 ["1867"]). Descriptions of marine Gasteropodæ, inhabiting Polynesia. American Journal of Conchology. 3(3): 211-222

Columbellidae